Laal is an endangered language isolate spoken by 749 people in three villages in the Moyen-Chari prefecture of Chad on opposite banks of the Chari River, 
called Gori (lá), Damtar (ɓual), and Mailao. It represents an isolated survival of an earlier language group of Central Africa. It is unwritten except in transcription by linguists. According to former Summer Institute of Linguistics-Chad member David Faris, it is in danger of extinction, with most people under 25 shifting to the locally more widespread Bagirmi.

This language first came to the attention of academic linguists in 1977 through Pascal Boyeldieu's fieldwork in 1975 and 1978. His fieldwork was based, for the most part, on a single speaker, Djouam Kadi of Damtar.

Speakers and status
The language's speakers are mainly river fishermen and farmers, who also sell salt extracted from the ashes of doum palms and Vossia cuspidata. Like their neighbours, the Niellim, they were formerly cattle herders but lost their herds around the turn of the 19th century. They are mainly Muslims, but until the latter half of the 20th century, they followed the traditional Yondo religion of the Niellim.  The area is fairly undeveloped; while there are Qur'anic schools in Gori and Damtar, the nearest government school is 7 km away, and there is no medical dispensary in the region.

The village of Damtar formerly had a distinct dialect, called Laabe (la:bé), with two or three speakers remaining in 1977; it was replaced by the dialect of Gori after two Gori families fled there at the end of the 19th century to escape a war. No other dialects of Laal are known.

Under Chadian law, Laal, like all languages of Chad other than French and Arabic, is regarded as a national language. Although the 1996 Constitution stipulates that "the law shall fix the conditions of promotion and development of national languages", national languages are not used for education, for official purposes, or usually for written media, but some of the larger ones (but not Laal) are used on the radio.

Classification
Laal remains unclassified, although extensive Adamawa (specifically Bua) and to a lesser extent Chadic influence is found. It is sometimes grouped with one of those two language families, and sometimes seen as a language isolate.  Boyeldieu (1982) summarizes his view as "Its classification remains problematic; while it shows certain lexical, and no doubt morphological, traits with the Bua languages (Adamawa-13, Niger–Congo family of Joseph H. Greenberg), it differs from them radically in many ways of which some, a priori, make one think of geographically nearby Chadic languages."  Roger Blench (2003), similarly, considers that "its vocabulary and morphology seem to be partly drawn from Chadic (i.e. Afro-Asiatic), partly from Adamawa (i.e. Niger–Congo) and partly from an unknown source, perhaps its original phylum, a now-vanished grouping from Central Africa."  It is the last possibility which attracts particular interest; if this proves true, Laal may be the only remaining window on the linguistic state of Central Africa before the expansion of the main African language families—Afro-Asiatic, Nilo-Saharan, and Niger–Congo—into it.

Their immediate neighbors speak Bua, Niellim, and Ndam. Laal contains a number of loanwords from Baguirmi, which for several centuries was the lingua franca of the region under the Baguirmi Empire, and perhaps a dozen Chadic roots, which are not similar to the Chadic languages that currently neighbor Laal. In addition, almost all Laal speak Niellim as a second language, and 20%–30% of their vocabulary is cognate with Niellim, especially agricultural vocabulary (Boyeldieu 1977, Lionnet 2010). Like the Baguirmi, the Laal are Muslims; partly because of this, some Arabic loanwords are also found. However some 60% of the vocabulary, including most core vocabulary, cannot be identified with any known language family (Lionnet 2010). Indeed, some of the words cognate with Niellim, including some basic vocabulary, is not cognate with closely related Bua, suggesting that these are not Adamawa roots but loans in Niellim from the Laal substrate (Lionnet 2010). Pozdniakov (2010) believes Laal is a distinct branch of Niger–Congo with part of its pronominal system borrowed from a Chadic language like Kera.

Alternatively, it may be a language descending from a language of a group of Neolithic Near Eastern farmers who immigrated to Chad, since recent genetic studies have found that the Laal people have significant Eurasian admixture similar to Natufians and Neolithic Levantines.

Laal is grouped with the Chadic languages in an automated computational analysis (ASJP 4) by Müller et al. (2013), suggesting early contact with Chadic.

Phonology
The sounds of Laal are transcribed here using International Phonetic Alphabet symbols.

Consonants

Implosives and prenasalised stops as well as h are found only word-initially. Voiceless stops as well as s cannot occur at the end of a syllable.  occurs only intervocalically and word-finally.  appears exclusively in loanwords and certain numbers.  Prenasalized stops as well as the implosive  are extremely rare.

Vowels

In addition,  may occur very occasionally; Boyeldieu quotes the example of mỳlùg "red (pl.)".

There are three level tones: high (á), middle (a), low (à). Combinations mau occur on a single vowel, resulting in phonetic rising and falling tone, and which are phonemically sequences of level tones. Such cases are transcribed here by repeating the vowel (e.g. àá); long vowels are indicated only by a colon (e.g. a:).

They are transcribed in the suffix section as ↑, ↓, ↗, ↘ respectively.

In suffixes, ə and o undergo vowel harmony: they become  and u respectively if the preceding vowel is one of {i, u}. Likewise, r undergoes consonant harmony, becoming l after words containing l.  Suffixes with a neutral tone copy the final tone of the word to which they are suffixed.

Morphology

Syntax
The typical word order can be summarised as subject–(verbal particle)–verb–object–adverb; preposition–noun; possessed–possessor; noun–adjective.  Nouns can be fronted when topicalized.  See the sample sentences below for examples and the conjunctions for clause syntax.

Nouns
Nouns have plural and singular forms (the latter are perhaps better viewed as singulative in some cases), with plural formation hard to predict: kò:g "bone" > kuagmi "bones", tuà:r "chicken" > tò:rò "chickens", ɲaw "hunger" > ɲə̀wə́r "hungers". Nouns do not have arbitrary gender, but three natural genders (male, female, non-human) are distinguished by pronouns.

The possessive is expressed in two ways:
 "inalienable", or direct, possession: by following the possessed with the possessor (and modifying the tone or ending of the possessed in some cases): piá:r no "person's leg" ("leg person");
 alienable possession: by putting a connecting word, conjugated according to number and gender, between the possessed and the possessor: làgɨˋm má màr-dɨb "blacksmith's horse" ("horse CONN. man+of-forge"). The connecting word is sometimes abbreviated to a simple high tone.

However, if the possessor is a pronoun, it is suffixed with extensive vowel ablaut (in the first case) or prepositional forms with "at" and optionally the connector as well, are used (in the second case): na:ra ɟá ɗe: "my man" ("man CONN. at-me"), mùlù "her eye" ("eye-her", from mɨla "eye").  Some nouns (páw- "friend") occur only with bound pronouns and have no independent form. That is called obligatory possession and is found in many other language, usually for words referring to personal relationships.  See pronouns for the relevant suffixes.

A noun indicating someone who does, is, or has something can be formed with the prefix màr, meaning roughly "he/she/it who/of": màr jùgòr "landowner", màr ce "farmer" (ce = cultivate), màr pál "fisherman" (pál = to fish), màr pàlà ta: "a fisher of fish".

Laal does show traces of an old Adamawa-type noun-class system, but apart from loans, the forms do not appear to be cognate with the Adamawa system (Lionnet 2010).

Some singular and plural nouns in Laal (Blench (2017):

Pronouns

Personal
In the following tables, note the distinction between inclusive and exclusive we, found in many other languages but not English, and the gender differentiation of "I" in certain forms.  The inanimate plural has been dropped by most popular younger speakers in favour of the animate plural, but both are given below. The object paradigm for verbs is quite complex; only two of its several sets of allomorphs are given in the table below. "He" and "she" are used only for human referents; other nouns take the neuter pronoun. That is quite distinct from the languages with which Laal shares vocabulary, but Laal has traces of an old Adamawa-type noun-class system (Lionnet 2010). The first- and second-person plural forms are quite similar to Chadic languages (specifically, Kera) which are currently quite distant from the Laal-speaking region, but they have no similarities to Adamawa.

(The arrows indicate vowel harmony triggered in by the suffix by the root.)

Relative and indefinite pronouns

Interrogative
jé "what?", ɟè "who?", ɗé "where?", sɨ̀g "how much?".

Prepositions
Prepositions precede their objects: gɨ̀ pə:l "in(to) the village", kɨ́ jà:ná "to his body" (="to near him").

Verbs
The verb does not vary according to the person or gender of the subject, but some verbs (about a quarter of the verbs attested) vary according to its number: no kaw "the person eats", mùáŋ kɨw "the people eat". The plural form of the verb is hard to predict, but is often formed by ablaut (typically raising the vowel height) with or without a suffix -i(ɲ) or -ɨɲ and tonal change.  The verb, however, changes according to the direct object. It takes personal suffixes to indicate a pronominal direct object, and it commonly changes when a non-pronominal direct object is added to a transitive form with final low tone (formed similarly to the "centripetal", for which see below): ʔà ná ká "he will do"; ʔà ná kàrà mɨ́ná "he will do something"; ʔà kú na:ra "he sees the man"; ʔà kúù:rùúŋ "he sees you (pl.)".

The verb has three basic forms: simple, "centripetal", and "participative" to calque Boyeldieu's terminology. The simple form is used in the simple present tense or the imperative: ʔà duàg jə́w gə̀m "he goes down the riverbank" (lit. "he descend mouth riverbank"). The "centripetal" indicates action "hither", either spatially, motion towards the speaker, or temporally, action up to the present moment; it is formed mainly by suffixing a vowel (often, but not always, identical to the last vowel in the word): ʔà duàgà jə́w gə̀m "he comes down the riverbank (towards me)". The "participative", generally formed like the centripetal but with final high tone, generally indicates an omitted object or instrument: ʔà sá ɗa:g ʔà sɨ̀rɨ́ su "he takes a calabash and drinks water with it" (lit. "he take calabash he drink-participative water").

Immediately before the verb, a particle may be placed to indicate forms other than a simple present tense; such particles include ná (pl. ní) marking future tense, taá:/teé: (pl. tií:) marking continuous action, wáa: (pl. wíi:) marking motion, náa: (pl. níi:) being apparently a combination of ná and wáa:, mà (pl. mì) meaning "must", mɨ́ marking reported speech (apparently an evidential), mɨ́nà (pl. mínì) expressing intention, kò marking habitual action, ɓə́l or ga (pl. gi) marking incomplete action, and wó (always accompanied by ʔàle after the verb) meaning "maybe".

Mediopassives (see passive voice, middle voice) can be formed from transitive verbs by adding a suffix -↑ɨ́ɲ: no siár sà:b "someone ripped the cloth" > sà:b sérɨ́ɲ "the cloth ripped".  For the inverse, forming transitive verbs from intransitives, changes in tone or to the plural sometimes occur.

Verbal nouns can sometimes be formed, mainly from intransitives, by the addition of a suffix -(vowel)l, sometimes with ablaut and tone change: wal "fall" > wàlál "a fall", sùbá "lie" > sɨ́blál (pl. súbɨ̀r) "a lie".  The l becomes n near a nasal and r near r: man "taste good", manan "a good taste".

Adjectives
Adjectives do not seem to constitute an independent category in Laal; to all intents and purposes, they behave just like verbs: gò: ʔì:r "the goat is black".  Attributively, they are typically linked as a relative clause: gò: má ʔì:r "the black goat" (literally "goat which black".)

Numbers

Adverbs
Adverbs generally come at the end of the clause. Here are some important adverbs:

Adverbs of location:
 "here": ɗágàl, núŋú
 "there": ɗaŋ
 "over there, yonder": ɗàŋá

Temporal adverbs:
 "day before yesterday": tá:r
 "yesterday": ʔiè:n
 "today": cicam, tari-màá
 "recently": bèrè
 "soon": sugo
 "tomorrow": jìlí-kà:rì
 "day after tomorrow": miàlgà

Modals
Here are the most important modals:

Before the verb: mɨ́ "(say) that", gàná "then"
After the verb: wó "not", (ʔà)le "maybe", ɓə́l "again", ʔá or gà "already", à interrogative, wá exclamatory, ta "now", cám "again, anew".

Conjunctions
Conjunctions can be divided into five types:

 only (main clause - conjunction - subordinate clause}: mɨ́ "(say) that", ɓə "because"
 either {main clause - conjunction - subordinate clause} or {conjunction - subordinate clause - main clause}: ɟò "if", dànngà (possibly from Baguirmian) "when"
 circumposed: either {conjunction - main clause - conjunction - subordinate clause} or {conjunction - subordinate clause - conjunction - main clause}: ɟò... gàná "if"
 coordinate clause - conjunction - coordinate clause: ní "then afterwards", ku "then", kó "nonetheless", á or ná "and", ɓe: "or", ʔàmá (from Arabic or Baguirmian) "but".
 circumposed: conjunction - coordinate clause - conjunction - coordinate clause: ku... ku "then", jàn... jàn "both... and".

Sample sentences
mùáŋ lá tií: kìrì jé? "What do the people of Gori do?" (lit. "people Gori progressive-plural do-plural-transitive what?")
mùáŋ lá tií: pál. "The people of Gori fish." (lit. "people Gori progressive-plural fish.")
màr-ce ɓɨ́lá mɨ́ "bɨ̀là, ʔò teé: ɗɨ̀grɨ̀r". "The farmer said 'No way!  You're tricking me.'" (lit. "man+who-cultivate say that no-way you progressive trick-me".)
 ɟá ná wùsù na pè:rí ní ʔárí ʔò ná kìnì jé? "If/When I take out the snake, what will you give me?" (lit. "I (masc.) will take+out-transitive for-you (sing.) snake then first you give-me-transitive what?")
 jà kàskàr mà mùáŋ lá sə̀ɲə́ be. "It's with swords that the people of Gori fight." (lit. "with swords emphatic (inan.) people Gori fight-participative battle.")

See also
Laal Swadesh list (Wiktionary)

References

 Roger Blench. Archaeology, Language, and the African Past. Altamira Press forthcoming.
 Pascal Boyeldieu. 1977. "Eléments pour une phonologie du laal de Gori (Moyen-Chari), Etudes phonologiques tchadiennes, Paris, SELAF (Bibliothèque, 63–64), p. 186–198.
 Pascal Boyeldieu. 1982. Deux études laal (Moyen-Chari, Tchad), in Verbindung mit SELAF, Paris.  Berlin: Reimer.  Marburger Studien zur Afrika- und Asienkunde: Ser. A, Afrika; Bd. 29.  .
 Pascal Boyeldieu. 1982. "Quelques questions portant sur la classification du laal (Tchad)". in JUNGRAITHMAYR, H., The Chad languages in the Hamitosemitic-Nigritic Border Area (Papers of the Marburg Symposium, 1979). Berlin : Reimer, p. 80–93. Coll. Marburger Studien zur Afrika- und Asienkunde, Serie A : Afrika.
 Pascal Boyeldieu. 1987. "Détermination directe/indirecte en laal". in BOYELDIEU, P., La maison du chef et la tête du cabri : des degrés de la détermination nominale dans les langues d'Afrique centrale. Paris : Geuthner, p. 77–87. 
 David Faris, 19 September 1994.  "In-House Summary: Laal/Gori language". SIL/Chad Survey Team.  (Unpublished.)
 Florian Lionnet & Konstantin Pozdniakov, "Laal: an isolate language?", in Language Isolates in Africa workshop, Lyons, December 4, 2010

External links
Laal at LLACAN
The Genographic Project: Zalloua's notes including two recordings of the Laal recordings online
Laal Swadesh list (from Florian Lionnet)

Endangered languages of Africa
Languages of Chad
Language isolates of Africa
Endangered language isolates